Asura compsodes is a moth of the family Erebidae. It is found in Australia (northern Queensland)

Adults are black with a bold pattern of yellow spots.

References

compsodes
Moths described in 1940
Moths of Australia